Flavocrambus aridellus is a moth in the family Crambidae. It was described by South in 1901 in the Transactions of the Entymological Society of London. It is found in China (Hubei, Shensi).

References

Crambinae
Moths described in 1901